RSM US LLP is an audit, tax, and consulting firm focused on the middle market in the United States and Canada and is a member of the global accounting network RSM International. It is the fifth largest accounting firm in the United States and employs more than 17,000 professionals across 93 cities nationwide and in Canada. RSM US also maintains offices in India and El Salvador. Since 2012, RSM US has been headquartered in downtown Chicago.

Through RSM International, the firm brings together more than 51,000 professionals from over 800 offices located in more than 123 countries.

History

The firm was founded in 1926 by Ira B. McGladrey (1883-1952) in Cedar Rapids, Iowa. McGladrey became a prominent figure in public accounting in Iowa, serving as President of the Iowa Society of Certified Public Accountants, chairman of the Iowa Board of Accountancy, as well as a member of the Rules Committee of the American Institute of Certified Public Accountants, the premier governing body for the field of accounting in the United States. The firm continued to operate under some variant of the McGladrey name until 2015.

Legal structure
Beginning in 1999, through a partnership with H&R Block, McGladrey operated under two separate legal entities:

 McGladrey & Pullen, LLP
 RSM McGladrey, Inc.

McGladrey & Pullen operated under the traditional partnership structure and offered audit and attestation services. RSM McGladrey was established under the partnership agreement with H&R Block to provide tax and advisory services under an alternative practice structure.

In August 2011, H&R Block announced the conclusion of the partnership, divesting RSM McGladrey to McGladrey & Pullen and reuniting the firms in their traditional partnership structure. McGladrey & Pullen acquired all employees, assets, and infrastructure from RSM McGladrey. The deal closed on December 1, 2011.

On May 1, 2012, McGladrey & Pullen officially changed its name to McGladrey LLP. In July 2012, McGladrey shifted its headquarters from Bloomington, Minnesota to Chicago.

On October 26, 2015, McGladrey LLP changed its name to RSM US LLP as part of a worldwide rebranding of RSM International members.

Service lines

Audit & Financial Reporting Services 

 Global Audit
 Public Company Audit
 Private Company Audit
 Employee Plan Benefit Audit

Tax Advisory Services 

 Federal Tax
 Indirect Tax
 State & Local Tax
 International Tax Planning Strategies
 Credits and Incentives
 Tax Function Optimization

Consulting Services 

 Strategy & Management Consulting
 Technology Consulting
 Financial Advisory
 Valuation Services
 Litigation & Dispute Advisory
 Financial Investigations
 Restructuring & Bankruptcy
 Risk Advisory
 M&A Transaction Advisory Services
 Technical Accounting

Awards and recognition

2021 

 Accounting Today ranked RSM the fifth largest accounting, tax and consulting services firm in the U.S. for the 16th consecutive year
Great Place to Work® named RSM one of the 2021 Best Workplaces in Consulting & Professional Services™
 Great Place to Work® and Fortune named RSM one of the 2021 100 Best Companies to Work For®
 RSM recognized as Best Tax and Audit Service Provider by HFM
 RSM received Handshake’s Early Talent Award
 RSM recognized on America’s Best Tax and Accounting Firms 2021 list by Forbes
 RSM recognized on Human Rights Campaign’s 2021 Corporate Equality Index
 RSM was named a Cisco Gold Partner

Sponsorships
RSM US LLP is the title sponsor of The RSM Classic, a PGA Tour event that takes place at Sea Island, Georgia in November of each year. The firm also sponsors professional golfers: PGA Tour professionals Zach Johnson, Abraham Ancer, Chris Kirk, Davis Love III, and Colin Montgomerie as well as LPGA professional golfers: Maria Fassi, and Megan Khang. In the European Tour, RSM US sponsors Alice Hewson, Hinrich Arkenau, Paul Lawrie, and Andy Sullivan.

References

External links

Accounting firms of the United States
Companies based in Chicago
Consulting firms established in 1926
RSM International